Edwards Guzmán (born September 11, 1976) is a former Major League Baseball player who is currently playing in the Puerto Rico Baseball League for the Indios de Mayagüez.

A catcher and infielder, Guzman played for the San Francisco Giants and Montreal Expos.

External links

1976 births
Living people
Binghamton Mets players
Dorados de Chihuahua players
Durham Bulls players
Edmonton Trappers players
Fresno Grizzlies players
Indianapolis Indians players
Indios de Mayagüez players
Lobos de Arecibo players
Major League Baseball catchers
Major League Baseball first basemen
Major League Baseball players from Puerto Rico
Major League Baseball third basemen
Montreal Expos players
Ottawa Lynx players
Sportspeople from Bayamón, Puerto Rico
Pericos de Puebla players
Puerto Rican expatriate baseball players in Canada
Puerto Rican expatriate baseball players in Mexico
San Francisco Giants players
San Jose Giants players
Shreveport Captains players
Tigres de Quintana Roo players